Alfred John "Ginger" Colton (25 March 1875 – 2 June 1946) was a rugby union player who represented Australia.

Colton, a number 8, was born in Brisbane Queensland and claimed two international rugby caps for Australia. His debut game was against Great Britain at Sydney on 24 June 1899, the inaugural rugby Test match played by an Australian national representative side.  His younger brother Tom Colton also represented for Australia in 1904.

Published references
 Collection (1995) Gordon Bray presents The Spirit of Rugby, Harper Collins Publishers Sydney
 Howell, Max (2005) Born to Lead - Wallaby Test Captains, Celebrity Books, Auckland NZ

Footnotes

Australian rugby union players
Australia international rugby union players
1875 births
1946 deaths
Rugby union players from Brisbane
Rugby union number eights